Aran (also Romanized as Ārān) is a village in Saidabad Rural District, in the Central District of Savojbolagh County, Alborz Province, Iran. At the 2006 census, its population was 342, in 94 families.

References 

Populated places in Savojbolagh County